Ibrahim Latifi (born 27 January 1939) is an Iranian footballer. He competed in the men's tournament at the 1964 Summer Olympics.

References

External links
 
 
 

1939 births
Living people
Iranian footballers
Iran international footballers
Olympic footballers of Iran
Footballers at the 1964 Summer Olympics
Place of birth missing (living people)
Association football midfielders